Nay is a surname and sometimes given name. Most notable people include:

Surname
 Ernst Wilhelm Nay (born 1902), German abstract painter
 Jonas Nay (born 1990), German actor and musician
 Mitch Nay (born 1993), American baseball player
 Cornelis Nay (born 1594), Dutch navigator and explorer
 Kong Nay (born 1946), Cambodian musician

Given name
Nay (lit. "sun") is a common Burmese name:
 Nay Toe (born 1981), Burmese film actor and comedian
 Nay Win Maung
 Ne Win
 Nay Zin Lat
 Nay Htoo Naing
 Nay Chi Oo
 Nay Shwe Thway Aung
 Nay Rein Kyaw
 Nay Win Myint
 Nay Phone Latt
 Nay Soe Maung
 Nay Lin Aung
 Nay Myo Aung
 Nay Myo Thant
 Nay Lin Tun
 Nay Myo Wai

Others:
 Nay Sleiman, Lebanese pop singer

Single name
Djenar Maesa Ayu, an Indonesian writer also known as Nay

Burmese names